Loppa ( and ) is a municipality in Troms og Finnmark county, Norway. The administrative centre of the municipality is the village of Øksfjord. Other villages in Loppa include Andsnes, Bergsfjord, Langfjordhamn, Loppa, Nuvsvåg, Øksfjordbotn, Sandland, and Sør-Tverrfjord.

The  municipality is the 167th largest by area out of the 356 municipalities in Norway. Loppa is the 341st most populous municipality in Norway with a population of 859.

Most people live in the village of Øksfjord, but smaller communities are spread out along the shores and islands, notably Nuvsvåg, Sandland, Bergsfjord, Brynilen, and the island of Loppa. This island was previously the administrative centre of the municipality (hence the name). There is no airport, but Øksfjord is a port of call for the Hurtigruten boats.

General information

The municipality of Loppa was established on 1 January 1838 (see formannskapsdistrikt law). In 1858, the northern part of Loppa on the island of Sørøya and most of Loppa on Stjernøya (population: 506) was separated to form the new municipality of Hasvik. This left Loppa with 801 residents. The borders of the municipality have not changed since that time.

On 1 January 2020, the municipality became part of the newly formed Troms og Finnmark county. Previously, it had been part of the old Finnmark county.

Name
The municipality is named after the island of Loppa (Old Norse: Loppa), since it was the former centre of the municipality and the first church (Loppa Church) was located there. The meaning of the name is uncertain, however it is mentioned to be of Norse origin. Historically, the name was spelled Loppen.

Coat of arms
The coat of arms was granted on 19 December 1980. The official blazon is "Or a cormorant wings elevated sable". This means the arms have a charge that is a great black cormorant in sable. The field (background) has a tincture of Or which means it is commonly colored yellow, but if it is made out of metal, then gold is used. The cormorant was chosen as a symbol since the municipality has several typical fishing villages which often attract cormorants which are reputed to be good fish-catchers. The yellow color in the field symbolizes the riches from the local fishing industry. The arms were designed by Arvid Sveen.

Churches
The Church of Norway has one parish within the municipality of Loppa. It is part of the Alta prosti (deanery) in the Diocese of Nord-Hålogaland. In the medieval ages Loppa was its own parish, with traces after an old church in the fishing village of Yttervær, on the island Loppa.

Geography
Loppa is the westernmost municipality of Finnmark and it faces the open stretch of the Norwegian Sea called Lopphavet, and it is mostly coastal with fjords and islands under the gigantic snowcap of the Øksfjordjøkelen glacier. The municipality includes most of the peninsula between the Kvænangen and the Altafjorden. There are also several islands in the municipality, notably Loppa, Silda, and part of Stjernøya. The mountains Lopptinden and Svartfjellet both lie in the municipality along with the glaciers Langfjordjøkelen, Øksfjordjøkelen, and Svartfjelljøkelen.

Climate

Government
All municipalities in Norway, including Loppa, are responsible for primary education (through 10th grade), outpatient health services, senior citizen services, unemployment and other social services, zoning, economic development, and municipal roads. The municipality is governed by a municipal council of elected representatives, which in turn elect a mayor.  The municipality falls under the Alta District Court and the Hålogaland Court of Appeal.

Municipal council
The municipal council  of Loppa is made up of 15 representatives that are elected to four year terms. The party breakdown of the council is as follows:

Mayors
The mayors of Loppa:

1839–1840: Jens Hjort Stuwitz 
1841–1847: Christopher A. Lassen 
1848–1849: Johan Axel Rask
1849–1857: Marius Meyer 
1858–1859: Nils Hjort Stuwitz 
1860–1861: Ove Kristian Brock 
1861–1862: Georg Peter Ulich 
1863–1869: Wilhelm Henrik Klerck Buck 
1869–1875: Peder Olsen Megrund  
1876–1877: Petter Steffensen Berg
1878–1880: Jens Rasmussen Kiil
1881–1897: Edvard Buck (H)
1897–1908: Arne Fosnes (V)
1909–1911: Reiel Nybø (H)
1912–1916: Arne Fosnes (V)
1916–1942: Ola Berg (V)
1945-1945: Bendix Berg (LL)
1945–1946: Edvin Pettersen (LL)
1947-1947: Ragnar Lyngmoe (Ap)
1948–1955: Nordahl Johansen (Ap)
1956–1959: Ole Grønnum (Ap)
1960–1961: Harald Samuelsberg (Ap)
1962–1967: Einar Fjelldahl (Ap)
1968–1979: Konrad J. Knutsen (Ap)
1980–1981: Edgar Flåten (Ap)
1982–1987: Torleif Gamst (Ap)
1988–1991: Konrad J. Knutsen (Ap)
1992–1995: Arne Gamst (SV)
1995-2007: Arne Dag Isaksen (Ap)
2007-2015: Jan-Eirik Jensen (K)
2015-2019: Steinar Halvorsen (H)
2019–present: Stein Thomassen (Ap)

History 
The area of Loppa is suggested to have been inhabited since the Mesolithic times with traces after settlement and scattered findings in both Nuvsvåg, Øksfjord, Sandland, Loppa, Silda and Bergsfjord. The activity of fishing and whaling in the municipality seems to have its origins from ancient times.

Roman Age 
Little is known of this period historically and archaeologically in this area. However the discovering of a Roman Age longhouse from 120 AD, at the island of Loppa shows the earliest signs of settlement in the Early Iron Age. Perhaps was this the very beginning of Norse taxation of the Sami peoples in the area and the interaction between the two peoples of trade and commerce in fishing and the industry of the hunting of maritime mammals. The longhouse is also one of the oldest one ever discovered in Northern Norway.

Viking Age 
In 1962 a rich female Viking Age grave was discovered on the island of Loppa. It contained luxurious personal objects such as tortoise brooches, a round brooch in the Oseberg style, a whalebone plaque, beads, knife, scissor and an arrowhead. The female grave was dubbed "The Queens Grave" due to the manner in which she was buried. However she was most likely not a queen but a very important person indeed on Viking Age Loppa. Perhaps a housewife of a local chieftain? The wealth of the grave reflects that of the Norse elite's presence in the area. The burial was dated to the 9th century AD.

In 1964 a longhouse from Viking Age was also discovered dated to the end of the 8th century AD. Several other buildings and boathouses was also discovered and dated to the same period as the longhouse and the rich female grave. There is also several burials from Iron Age on the island, where the biggest a burial cairn with the size of 13 meters in diameter. The amount of Iron Age burials and houses suggests that of a more permanent Norse settlement.

Middle Ages 
In Middle Ages, the hunting and the production of oil from marine mammals seems to stop, and fishing becomes more important. Along the coast of Northern Norway we see so called farm mounds of ancient settlements, and at Loppa there are at least 6 farm mounds spread out on the island of Loppa, Silda and at mainland Andsnes. However, the farm mounds of Northern Norway seem to have their upbringing already in Early Iron Age, suggesting that fishing was already a commercial trade before the Middle Ages. On the island of Loppa one of the farm mounds was dated to the 1100s AD, with a church site close by. This suggests that Loppa was its own parish already in the Middle Ages.

Notable people 
 Hans E. Kinck (1865 in Øksfjord – 1926) a Norwegian author and philologist who wrote novels, short stories, dramas, and essays
 Harald Nicolai Samuelsberg (1911 in Loppa – 1986) a Norwegian politician & Mayor of Loppa 
 Hallgeir Pedersen (born 1973) a Norwegian jazz guitarist, raised in Øksfjord
 Magnus Andersen (born 1986 in Øksfjord) a Norwegian football midfielder with over 300 club caps

References

External links

Municipal fact sheet from Statistics Norway 

 
Municipalities of Troms og Finnmark
Populated places of Arctic Norway
1838 establishments in Norway